Butterfly Explosion are an alternative rock band from Dublin, Ireland.

History
Butterfly Explosion was formed by guitarist/vocalist Gazz Carr in 2005.

By 2007, the band had released two EPs while going through a number of lineup changes. John Coman (drums), Conor Garry (bass) and Laura Smyth (vocals) joined the band in 2008 as recording began on the debut album with producer Torsten Kinsella of Irish post-rock band God Is an Astronaut.

The debut album Lost Trails was released in 2010 on the Revive Records label. The album was released in the United States in March 2010 ahead of their appearance at 
South by Southwest and broke into the CMJ 200 charts having entered the Top 30 of 35 college radio stations.

In May 2010, they performed at the Soundcity Festival in Liverpool and supported label mates God Is An Astronaut on their UK and European tours. The band also performed at the Electric Picnic and Arthur's Day Festivals in Ireland in September 2010.

Discography

LPs
Lost Trails (2010)

EPs
Turn the Sky (2006)
Vision (2005)

References

External links
Official site
Butterfly Explosion on MySpace
Butterfly Explosion on Facebook

List of shoegazing musicians

Irish alternative rock groups
Irish post-rock groups